Krzysztof Stroiński (born 9 October 1950  in Pszczyna) is a Polish actor. He performed in more than forty films since 1971. He won the 2009 Polish Academy Award for Best Actor for his performance in Scratch.

Selected filmography

External links
 
 Profile on filmpolski.pl 

1950 births
Living people
Polish male film actors